The Fort-600 is a 40 mm stand-alone grenade launcher which is based on the Brügger & Thomet GL-06 and produced under license by the Ukrainian gun manufacturer RPC Fort. The Fort-600 intended to defeat the live targets and fire objects at a distance from 50 to 400 m and for shooting by non-lethal ammunition.

See also
 B&T GL-06 grenade launcher

References

External links
 Fort-600 Official page
 Fort-600A Official page 

40×46mm grenade launchers
Weapons of Ukraine